Srednyaya is a rural locality (a village) in Verkhovskoye Rural Settlement, Verkhovazhsky District, Vologda Oblast, Russia. The population was 60 as of 2002.

Geography 
Srednyaya is located 41 km southwest of Verkhovazhye (the district's administrative centre) by road. Sludnaya is the nearest rural locality.

References 

Rural localities in Verkhovazhsky District